Pan Pan or Panpan is a lost small Hindu Kingdom believed to have existed around the 3rd to 7th century CE. It is believed to have been located on the east coast of the Malay peninsula, with opinion varying from somewhere in Kelantan or Terengganu, in modern-day Malaysia to the vicinity of Amphoe Phunphin, Surat Thani Province, in modern Thailand. It is speculated to be related to Pan tan i (Pattani Kingdom), which occupied the same area many centuries later, and has some differences in culture and language to other Malay regions nearby.

History
Little is known about this kingdom. The kingdom was later conquered by Srivijaya under the leadership of Dharmasetu before 775 CE.

From the period of 424 to 453, Pan Pan sent its first missions to the Chinese Liu Song dynasty.  From here, Kaundinya II is said to have tried to re-introduce Hinduism to the Kingdom of Funan on the other side of the Gulf of Siam.

In the years 529, 533, 534, 535 and 571, Pan Pan sent tribute to the Liang dynasty and the Chen dynasty of China. In the years 616 and 637, Pan Pan sent tribute to the Chinese Tang dynasty.

Though rare, archeological discoveries show proof of a lively economic flowering in the region through international maritime trade.

See also
 Nakhon Si Thammarat
 Bujang Valley
 Early History of Kedah

References 

Medieval Hindu kingdoms
History of Kelantan
History of Terengganu
Former countries in Thai history
Pre-Muslim kingdoms in Malaysian history
History of Malaysia
3rd-century establishments
7th-century disestablishments in Asia
States and territories established in the 3rd century
States and territories disestablished in the 7th century
Ancient Thailand
Former kingdoms